Machiwaal is a 250-year-old village located in Gujrat district, in the south of Punjab, Pakistan. It is an agricultural community; 95% of the population are farmers, while the remainder live abroad. Major crops are wheat, millet, and rice, along with peas and pulses. A grand festival is conducted when the wheat crop is harvested every year in April.

The population is Muslim, with 93% Sunni and 7% Shi'a. The village has three schools which provide primary education, as well as a high school.  Punjabi and Urdu are the two local languages. Machiwaal has a literacy rate of 38%.

References

External links
Google Maps

Populated places in Gujrat District
Union councils of Gujrat District